Max Christian Theodor Steenbeck (21 March 1904 – 15 December 1981) was a German physicist who worked at the  Siemens-Schuckertwerke in his early career, during which time he invented the betatron in 1934.  He was taken to the Soviet Union after World War II, and he contributed to the Soviet atomic bomb project.  In 1955, he returned to East Germany to continue a career in nuclear physics.

Early life

Steenbeck was born in Kiel. He studied physics and chemistry at the University of Kiel from 1922 to 1927.  He completed his thesis on x-rays under Walther Kossel; he submitted the thesis in 1927/1928 and his doctorate was awarded in January 1929.
While a student at Kiel, he formulated the concept of the cyclotron.

Career

Early years

From 1927 to 1945, Steenbeck was a physicist at the  Siemens-Schuckertwerke in Berlin.  From 1934, he was a laboratory director, and it was in that year that he submitted a patent for the betatron.  In 1943, he was appointed technical director of a static converter plant at Siemens, conducting research in gas-discharge physics. Additionally, at his plant, he was head of the Volkssturm (people's army), the organised civilian resistance at the plant, which was to, as a last resort, defend the territory.

In the Soviet Union

At the close of World War II he was arrested by the Soviet military forces, and he was incarcerated at a concentration camp in Poznań.  He wrote to the NKVD and explained his scientific background.  Eventually, he was taken to recuperate at the dacha Opalicha at the end of 1945, after which he was sent to work at  Manfred von Ardenne’s Institute A, in Sinop, a suburb of Sukhumi.  He headed a group working on both electromagnetic and centrifugal isotope separation for the enrichment of uranium, with the latter having the highest priority.  Steenbeck and his group were pioneers in the development of supercritical centrifuges.  Steenbeck’s group, at its largest, included from 60 to 100 German and Russian personnel.  Steenbeck was kept in the Soviet Union until 1956, when he went to East Germany.

While Steenbeck developed the theory of the centrifugal isotope separation process, Gernot Zippe, an Austrian, headed the experimental effort in Steenbeck’s group.  Zippe, a POW from the Krasnogorsk camp, joined the group in the summer of 1946.  Zippe returned to Germany in 1956.  In 1957, he attended a conference on centrifugal isotope separation; it was then that he realized how advanced the work had been in Steenbeck’s group, and Zippe then applied for a patent on short-bowl centrifuge technology, known as the Zippe-type centrifuge.  He was invited to repeat the experiments at the University of Virginia.  Shortly after completing the work, at the request of the United States, all centrifuge research in Germany became classified on August 1, 1960.  The work of Steenbeck and Zippe shaped European and Japanese enrichment processes and later those in Pakistan and Iraq.

Steenbeck and Zippe, before being allowed to leave the Soviet Union, were put into quarantine in the second half of 1952.  During the quarantine period, they only performed unclassified work. First they went to Leningrad, after which they worked in the Institute of Semiconductors of the Academy of Sciences in Kiev.  They both left the Soviet Union in 1956.

Return to (East) Germany

In 1956, Steenbeck became an ordinarius professor of plasma physics at the Friedrich Schiller University of Jena, and, from 1956 to 1959, he was also director of the Institute for Magnetic Materials at Jena. From 1958 to 1969, he was director of the German Academy of Science Institute for Magnetohydrodynamics, also in Jena. From 1957 to 1963, he was the head of the Technological Science Bureau on Reactor Construction, in Berlin. From 1962 to 1964, he was vice-president and in 1965 president of the German Academy of Science. In 1970, he was president of the East German Committee on European Security. In 1976, Steenbeck was honorary president of the East German Research Council. He died in East Berlin.

The Max-Steenbeck Gymnasium in Cottbus, an academic high school offering extended mathematical-scientific-technical training, was named in his honour. .

Selected literature

 W. Kossel and M. Steenbeck Absolute Messung des Quantenstroms im Röntgenstrahl,  Zeitschrift für Physik Volume 42, Numbers 11-12, 832-834 (1927).  The authors were cited as being from the Physikalisches Institut, Kiel.  The article was received on 14. March 1927.
Alfred von Engel and Max Steenbeck On the Gas-Temperature in the Positive Column of an Arc Phys. Rev.  Volume 37, Issue 11, 1554 - 1554 (1931).  The authors were cited as being at Wissenschaftliche Abteilung, der Siemens-Schuckertwerke A.-G., Berlin.  The article was received on 28 April 1931.

Books

Max Steenbeck Probleme und Ergebnisse der Elektro- und Magnetohydrodynamik (Akademie-Verl., 1961)
Max Steenbeck, Fritz Krause, and Karl-Heinz Rädler Elektrodynamische Eigenschaften turbulenter Plasmen (Akademie-Verl., 1963)
Max Steenbeck Wilhelm Wien und sein Einfluss auf die Physik seiner Zeit (Akademie-Verl., 1964)
Max Steenbeck Die wissenschaftlich-technische Entwicklung und Folgerungen für den Lehr- und Lernprozess im System der Volksbildung der Deutschen Demokratischen Republik (VEB Verl. Volk u. Wissen, 1964)
Max Steenbeck Wachsen und Wirken der sozialistischen Persönlichkeit in der wissenschaftlich-technischen Revolution (Dt. Kulturbund, 1968)
Max Steenbeck Impulse und Wirkungen. Schritte auf meinem Lebensweg. (Verlag der Nation, 1977)

Bibliography

Albrecht, Ulrich, Andreas Heinemann-Grüder, and Arend Wellmann Die Spezialisten: Deutsche Naturwissenschaftler und Techniker in der Sowjetunion nach 1945 (Dietz, 1992, 2001) 
Barwich, Heinz and Elfi Barwich Das rote Atom (Fischer-TB.-Vlg., 1984)
Heinemann-Grüder, Andreas Keinerlei Untergang: German Armaments Engineers during the Second World War and in the Service of the Victorious Powers in Monika Renneberg and Mark Walker (editors) Science, Technology and National Socialism 30-50 (Cambridge, 2002 paperback edition) 
Hentschel, Klaus (editor) and Ann M. Hentschel (editorial assistant and translator) Physics and National Socialism: An Anthology of Primary Sources (Birkhäuser, 1996) 
Holloway, David Stalin and the Bomb: The Soviet Union and Atomic Energy 1939 – 1956 (Yale, 1994) 
Naimark, Norman M. The Russians in Germany: A History of the Soviet Zone of Occupation, 1945-1949 (Hardcover - Aug 11, 1995) Belknap
Oleynikov, Pavel V. German Scientists in the Soviet Atomic Project, The Nonproliferation Review Volume 7, Number 2, 1 – 30  (2000).  The author has been a group leader at the Institute of Technical Physics of the Russian Federal Nuclear Centre in Snezhinsk (Chelyabinsk-70).
Riehl, Nikolaus and Frederick Seitz Stalin’s Captive: Nikolaus Riehl and the Soviet Race for the Bomb (American Chemical Society and the Chemical Heritage Foundations, 1996) .  This book is a translation of Nikolaus Riehl’s book Zehn Jahre im goldenen Käfig (Ten Years in a Golden Cage) (Riederer-Verlag, 1988); Seitz has written a lengthy introduction to the book. This book is a treasure trove with its 58 photographs.

External links
Lawrence and His Laboratory - II — A Million Volts or Bust in Heilbron, J. L., and Robert W. Seidel Lawrence and His Laboratory: A History of the Lawrence Berkeley Laboratory', Volume I. (Berkeley:  University of California Press, 2000) 
Tracking the technology – Nuclear Engineering International, 31 August 2004
NYT – William J. Broad Slender and Elegant, It Fuels the Bomb, New York Times March 23, 2004

Notes

1904 births
1981 deaths
20th-century German physicists
Scientists from Kiel
People from the Province of Schleswig-Holstein
East German scientists
German expatriates in the Soviet Union
Foreign Members of the USSR Academy of Sciences
Recipients of the Lomonosov Gold Medal
Members of the German Academy of Sciences at Berlin
Volkssturm personnel